Platytes ornatellus is a moth in the family Crambidae. It was described by John Henry Leech in 1889. It is found in the Russian Far East (Minussinsk, Ussuri), China (Manchuria, Shandong, Szechwan, Tibet), Korea and Japan.

References

Crambini
Moths described in 1889
Moths of Asia